Montu is an inverted roller coaster at Busch Gardens Tampa Bay in Tampa, Florida. Designed by Swiss manufacturer Bolliger & Mabillard, it is the park's second roller coaster designed by that company following the success of Kumba, which opened 3 years prior. When the ride opened on May 16, 1996, it was the world's tallest and fastest inverted roller coaster, a title it has since conceded to Alpengeist at sister park Busch Gardens Williamsburg.

History
The concept of an inverted roller coaster with inversions was developed by Jim Wintrode, the general manager of Six Flags Great America, in the early 1990s. To develop the idea, Wintrode worked with Walter Bolliger and Claude Mabillard—from Swiss roller coaster manufacturer Bolliger & Mabillard—and engineer Robert Mampe to develop Batman: The Ride which opened in May 1992.

In early 1995, planning began for Montu, fourteen months prior to the ride opening to the public. The owners of Busch Gardens Tampa Bay, Busch Entertainment (since renamed SeaWorld Entertainment), entered into an agreement with Bolliger and Mabillard which would see them add Montu to Busch Gardens Tampa Bay in 1996, followed in 1997 by the additions of Alpengeist at Busch Gardens Williamsburg and The Great White at SeaWorld San Antonio.

On August 23, 1995, Busch Gardens Tampa announced that they would be getting a new Egypt section. The area would cover  of land and feature a few attractions, including Tut's Tomb and the centerpiece attraction being a new Bolliger & Mabillard inverted roller coaster. It would be the first inverted roller coaster to feature seven inversions, as well as being the first roller coaster to feature an Immelmann loop. Besides this, the ride would be the first Bolliger & Mabillard coaster to feature a boomerang element, which debuted on Orient Express at Worlds of Fun in 1980. The Egypt section would be the largest and most expensive investment in Busch Gardens Tampa's history. On October 30, the park announced that they would be naming their new coaster Montu. On May 16, 1996, Montu officially opened to the public. At the time of its opening to the public, the ride was the tallest and fastest inverted roller coaster in the world. 

For the 2022 season, Montu was repainted with a darker navy blue track and yellow supports.

Characteristics

It has the most inversions on an inverted coaster, tied with Banshee at Kings Island. Riders experience up to 3.8 times the force of gravity on the 3 minute ride. Montu operates with three steel and fiberglass trains, each containing eight cars, each sitting 4 riders in per row for a total of 32 riders per train. 

Montu was launched alongside Busch Gardens Tampa Bay's Egypt section of the park, which reportedly cost approximately US$20 million. With an overall theme around Egyptian mythology, the ride is named after the god of war Montu, a man depicted with the head of a hawk. When the ride was first launched, a Nile crocodile exhibit was located underneath the first turn out of the station. These animals were later relocated to the park's main animal habitat.

Ride experience

Queue
Guests enter an Egyptian temple, where the queue takes place. The queue begins with a large outdoor area with switchbacks. There is an extended queue area with multiple pathways and a viewing area of the ride. Following this, guests navigate through a corridor. They enter another area containing Egyptian murals on the walls. Guests then enter the station where they board the ride. An extra switchback section can be occasionally used to access the front seat.

Layout
The ride begins with the floor retracting which leads to the front gate opening. The trains leaves the station with a small dip and turnaround out of the station tracking towards the  chain lift hill. After completing the Immelmann, the train goes through a zero-g roll, where riders experience a feeling of weightlessness. Following the zero-g roll, the track hits a batwing, entering a trench at the valley between the two inversions. Leaving the batwing, the track rises up in to the mid-course brake run. Following the second brake run, the track makes a dive to the right into a trench where it hits a  vertical loop. The track then exits the trench, making a three-quarter clockwise turn. After passing under the zero-g roll, the track makes a left hand turn over the first vertical loop's exit and dives into another trench to hit a corkscrew, before making another right turn onto the final brake run.

Reception

Montu has generally been well received. Tom Buckingham of the Sarasota Herald-Tribune commended the ride, giving kudos to the park "for designing its monster rides so that wait times put Disney to shame". He stated "you'll generally be on the ride and screaming" before riders get a chance to change their mind. Sabrina Rojas Weiss of the Lakeland Ledger stated "the way this ride twisted my body upside-down and sideways seriously confused my senses". The Los Angeles Times put the ride on their "high rollers" list of new roller coasters for 1996. In 2012, Montu was featured on the Travel Channel TV series Insane Coaster Wars in the "Hang 'em High" category. Although the ride lost out to Aftershock at Silverwood Theme Park, Theme Park Review's Robb Alvey believed Montu would beat the competition which also included SeaWorld Orlando's Manta and Busch Gardens Williamsburg's Alpengeist.

In Amusement Todays annual Golden Ticket Awards, Montu has consistently ranked highly. Montu is also one of only seven roller coasters to appear in the top 50 for all 15 years. It debuted at position 3 in 1998, before rising to position 2 the following year.

References

External links
 
 

Busch Gardens Tampa Bay
Roller coasters in Florida
Inverted roller coasters
Roller coasters in Tampa, Florida
Roller coasters introduced in 1996
Roller coasters manufactured by Bolliger & Mabillard
Steel roller coasters
1996 establishments in Florida
Inverted roller coasters manufactured by Bolliger & Mabillard